The Templars are an Oi! band formed in Long Island, New York in April 1991. The band's musical influences include Oi!, punk rock, glam rock and rock and roll. They have tended to purposely use low-quality recording techniques (their Acre Studios is a garage).

The band recognizes Perry Hardy as their full-time bassist and Chris White as full-time guitarist, even though they do not play on the albums (with the exception of Hardy on two albums).  The band currently uses a lineup of four musicians for concerts, with a second guitar player, but still usually records as only a two-piece (with Carl Fritscher playing all bass and guitar parts, as well as vocals with Phil Rigaud on drums).

The band's name comes from an ancient order of Christian militants called the Knights Templar. Their focus on Middle Ages history is largely informed by Carl Fritscher (singer/guitarist) and Phil Rigaud's (drummer) studies and interests. A Templars album cover was displayed in a History Channel documentary about the Knights Templar. The narrator states that the legacy of the medieval organization has influenced varied aspects of modern society, including as film, literature and "hardcore punk music."

Partial discography

Albums
The Return of Jacques DeMolay - 1994 - Dim Records
Phase II - 1997 - Dim Records Germany/Vulture Rock
Omne Datum Optimum - 1999 - GMM Records
Horns of Hattin - 2001 - GMM Records
Outremer 2005 - GMM Records
Deus Vult - 2017 - Pirates Press Records
There is also a compilation LP of their earliest recorded material entitled "'Pure Brickwall 
Recordings' 6/92-8/92 and demos early 1993. First 4 track tapes!" which is labeled as being released by Vulture Rock and When Typhoid Courtney Drops, a possible subsidiary of Vulture Rock.

Split 12"s
Super Yobs Showdown (split with Red Alert) - 1994 - Vulture Rock
split with The Glory Stompers - 1996 - Knockout Records

7"s
The Poor Knights of Acre - 1993 - Sonic Aggression
Clockwork Orange Horrorshow (double 7") - 1995 - Vulture Rock
La noche de las gaviotas(sic) (aka Night of the Seagulls) - 1997 - Headache Records
Milites Templi - 2000 - TKO/Templecombe
The French Connection - 2004 - Bords de Seine
Out of the Darkness - 2008 - TKO/Templecombe

EPs
Beauséant (mini CD)- 1994 - Dim Records
1118-1312 (CD/10") - 1997  - Do A Runner/Go-Kart
I.S.P. Connection (with Stomper 98 and Vortex) - DSS/Cargo

Split 7"s
Powerfist (split with Oxblood) - 1994 - Vulture Rock
split with 90 Proof - 1996 - 90 Proof Records
split with Bottom of the Barrel - 1997 - Oink! Records
split with Lower Class Brats - 1997  - TKO Records
split with Wodnes Thegnas - Haunted Town Records
split with Gundog - 1999 - New Blood
Ivano + The Templars - 1999 - Durango 95/Pinhead Generation
We Stick Together (split with Stomper 98) -1999 - DSS Records
split with P38  -2000 - Disagree Records
split with Devilskins - 2001 - Oi!Strike
Battle for the Airwaves Vol 2 (split with Workin Stiffs, The Bodies, The Wretched Ones) - 200? -Radio Records
split with Crashed Out - 2005 - TKO/Templecombe
split with The New Chords - 2010 - Randale Records
split with The Cliche's - 2011 -  Randale/Templecombe

Compilation Appearances
Anti-Disco League - Templecombe/TKO
Oi! It's a World Invasion! Vol. 1 - Step 1/Bronco Bullfrog
Oi! This is Dynamite! - Step 1/Bronco Bullfrog
Step on a Crack - Sound Views/Go-Kart
Oi! It's a World Invasion! Vol. 2 - Step 1/Bronco Bullfrog
Oi! The Gathering - Sta-Prest
Backstreets of American Oi! - Sta-Prest
Oi Against Racism - Havin' A Laugh
Super Yobs Showdown Vol. 1 - Vulture Rock
US of Oi Vol. 2 - GMM
Urban Soldiers: Tribute to the Oppressed - DSS/Longshot
Angry Punk For Urban Skunx - 45 Revolutions
Skins N Pinz - GMM
Skins N Pinz Vol. 2 - GMM

Many exclusive tracks on 7"s or compilations have been later compiled on CD (such as Milites Templi) and certain releases have been reissued on different labels and/or formats (such as Clockwork Orange Horrorshow).

External links
The Templars on Myspace
Interview - in Under the Volcano fanzine
SPQR - Phil Rigaud's skinhead reggae DJ night
Hammersmith NYC - Carl Fritscher's clothing company
Waterloo Services - Phil Rigaud's T-shirt company

Musical groups established in 1991
Punk rock groups from New York (state)
Street punk groups
People from Long Island
Oi! groups
1991 establishments in New York (state)